Maria Heubuch (born 12 December 1958) is a German politician and Member of the European Parliament (MEP) representing Germany since July 2014. She is a member of the Alliance 90/The Greens, part of the European Green Party.

Prior to entering politics Heubuch worked as a farmer and was a carer. She also served in various roles within the German farming community such as Federal Chair of the Working Group on Small-Scale Farming, District team member of the Association of German Dairy Farmers and board member of the Association for the Preservation of Family Farms.

Parliamentary service
Vice-Chair, Delegation for relations with the Pan-African Parliament (2014-)
Member, Committee on Development (2014-)
Member, Delegation to the ACP-EU Joint Parliamentary Assembly (2014-)

References

1958 births
Living people
Alliance 90/The Greens MEPs
German farmers
German women farmers
MEPs for Germany 2014–2019
21st-century women MEPs for Germany
People from Ravensburg